Jacek Zieliński (born 22 March 1961 in Tarnobrzeg) is a Polish manager and retired footballer, currently in charge of Cracovia.

Career
Zieliński began his career at Siarka Tarnobrzeg, and became captain in the 1977 season.

Manager career
Zieliński later took over the manager role at many Polish clubs, such as Korona Kielce, GKS Bełchatów, Górnik Łęczna, Groclin Dyskobolia, and Polonia Warsaw.

On 5 June 2009 he took over Lech Poznań, where he won the league in his first season with the team. After crashing out of Champions League qualifications in the third round, Zieliński led the team to the top of their Europa League group table after the first two games. However, Lech was underperforming in the league, with the team temporarily stranded at the very bottom of the table. On 2 November 2010, he was dismissed.

On 22 March 2011, he returned to Polonia Warsaw.

After a two-year hiatus, he returned to Polish football as a manager on 10 November 2021, taking charge of Cracovia for a second time in his career.

Honours

Manager
Lech Poznań
Ekstraklasa: 2009–10
Polish Super Cup: 2009

References

External links
 
 Jacek Zieliński trenerem Lecha Poznań

Polish footballers
Polish football managers
People from Tarnobrzeg
1961 births
Living people
Siarka Tarnobrzeg players
Gwardia Warsaw players
Stal Stalowa Wola players
Ekstraklasa managers
I liga managers
II liga managers
Lech Poznań managers
Odra Wodzisław Śląski managers
GKS Bełchatów managers
Ruch Chorzów managers
Piast Gliwice managers
Polonia Warsaw managers
Dyskobolia Grodzisk Wielkopolski managers
MKS Cracovia managers
Bruk-Bet Termalica Nieciecza managers
Arka Gdynia managers
Sportspeople from Podkarpackie Voivodeship
Association football midfielders